This is a list of films produced by the Tollywood film industry based in Hyderabad, Andhra Pradesh in 1963.

External links
 Earliest Telugu language films at IMDb.com (379 to 400)

1963
Telugu
Telugu films